3-Hydroxysteroid dehydrogenase (3-HSD) may refer to:

 3α-Hydroxysteroid dehydrogenase (3α-HSD)
 3β-Hydroxysteroid dehydrogenase (3β-HSD)

References

Enzymes